Ensamma mamman ("single mom") is a Swedish comic strip created by Cecilia Torudd. Ensamma mamman first made a brief appearance in Dagens Nyheter in 1985. It was well received by the readers and returned in 1987 as a fixed feature. Torudd continued drawing it until 1991, when it was syndicated by Bull, and it has since been rerun in many newspapers. Ensamma mamman deals with a single mother and her two teenage children, her 14-year-old son Beppe and her daughter Mia, 17 years old.  

Ensamma mamman received the Urhunden Prize by the Swedish Association for Promotion of Comics, in 1989.

Source

Swedish comic strips
1985 comics debuts
Comics about women
Gag-a-day comics
Female characters in comics
Comics set in Sweden
Comics characters introduced in 1985
Swedish comics characters